The Frankford Township School District is a comprehensive community public school district that serves students in pre-kindergarten through eighth grade from Frankford Township, in Sussex County, New Jersey, United States. Students from Branchville attend the district's school as part of a sending/receiving relationship.

As of the 2021–22 school year, the district, comprised of one school, had an enrollment of 505 students and 54.5 classroom teachers (on an FTE basis), for a student–teacher ratio of 9.3:1.

The district is classified by the New Jersey Department of Education as being in District Factor Group "FG", the fourth-highest of eight groupings. District Factor Groups organize districts statewide to allow comparison by common socioeconomic characteristics of the local districts. From lowest socioeconomic status to highest, the categories are A, B, CD, DE, FG, GH, I and J.

For ninth through twelfth grades, public school students attend High Point Regional High School. Attending the school are students from Branchville, Frankford Township, Lafayette Township, Montague Township, Sussex Borough and from Wantage Township (where the school is located). As of the 2021–22 school year, the high school had an enrollment of 812 students and 72.8 classroom teachers (on an FTE basis), for a student–teacher ratio of 11.2:1.

Schools
Frankford Township School had an enrollment of 503 students in 2021–22 in grades PreK-8 (based on data from the National Center for Education Statistics)
Braden Hirsch, Elementary School Principal
Amy Librizzi, Middle School Principal

Administration
Core members of the district's administration are:
Braden Hirsch, Superintendent
Christopher Lessard, Business Administrator / Board Secretary

Board of education
The district's board of education is comprised of nine members who set policy and oversee the fiscal and educational operation of the district through its administration. As a Type II school district, the board's trustees are elected directly by voters to serve three-year terms of office on a staggered basis, with three seats up for election each year held (since 2012) as part of the November general election. The board appoints a superintendent to oversee the district's day-to-day operations and a business administrator to supervise the business functions of the district.

References

External links
Frankford Township School District

School Data for the Frankford Township School District, National Center for Education Statistics
High Point Regional High School

Branchville, New Jersey
Frankford Township, New Jersey
New Jersey District Factor Group FG
School districts in Sussex County, New Jersey
Public K–8 schools in New Jersey